The National Partnership Office (NPO) is an office of the United States Forest Service. It is responsible for implementing National Rural Development Partnership policies and activities. The NPO provides budgetary and financial technical assistance to state rural development councils. 

Created in 2003, the Office works across the three branches of the Forest Service – cooperation with States and private landowners, forestry research and development, and management of the 155 national forests and 20 national grasslands.

External links
Official website
United States Forest Service